Constance Georgine Markievicz (Gore-Booth; 4 February 1868 – 15 July 1927), also known as Countess Markievicz and Madame Markievicz, was an Irish politician, revolutionary, nationalist, suffragist, socialist, and the first woman elected to the Westminster Parliament, and was elected Minister for Labour in the First Dáil, becoming the first female cabinet minister in Europe. She served as a Teachta Dála for the Dublin South constituency from 1921 to 1922 and 1923 to 1927. She was a Member of Parliament (MP) for Dublin St Patrick's from 1918 to 1922.

A founding member of Fianna Éireann, Cumann na mBan and the Irish Citizen Army, she took part in the Easter Rising in 1916, when Irish republicans attempted to end British rule and establish an Irish Republic. She was sentenced to death, commuted to life imprisonment on the grounds of her sex. On 28 December 1918, she was the first woman elected to the UK House of Commons, though, being in Holloway Prison at the time and in accordance with party policy, she did not take her seat. Instead, she and the other Sinn Féin MPs (as TDs) formed the first Dáil Éireann. She was also one of the first women in the world to hold a cabinet position, as Minister for Labour, from 1919 to 1922.

Markievicz supported the anti-Treaty side in the Irish Civil War. She continued as (abstentionist) Dáil member for Sinn Féin until 1926 when she became a founding member of Fianna Fáil. She died in 1927.

Early life 
Constance Georgine Gore-Booth was born at Buckingham Gate in London in 1868, the elder daughter of the Arctic explorer and adventurer Sir Henry Gore-Booth, 5th Baronet, an Anglo-Irish landlord who administered a  estate, and Georgina, Lady Gore-Booth, née Hill. During the famine of 1879–80, Sir Henry provided free food for the tenants on his estate at Lissadell House in the north of County Sligo in the north-west of Ireland. Their father's example inspired in Gore-Booth and her younger sister, Eva Gore-Booth, a deep concern for working people and the poor. The sisters were childhood friends of the poet W. B. Yeats, who frequently visited the family home Lissadell House, and were influenced by his artistic and political ideas. Yeats wrote a poem, "In Memory of Eva Gore-Booth and Con Markiewicz", in which he described the sisters as "two girls in silk kimono, both beautiful, one a gazelle" The gazelle being Eva, whom Yeats described as having "a gazelle like beauty". Eva later became involved in the labour movement and women's suffrage in Great Britain, although initially Constance did not share her sister's ideals.

Gore-Booth wished to train as a painter, to her family's dismay; in 1892, she went to study at the Slade School of Art in London, where she lived at the Alexandra House for Art Pupils, Kensington Gore, founded five years before by Sir Francis Cook, a wealthy great-uncle of Maud Gonne. One of her contemporaries there was Blanche Georgiana Vulliamy. It was at this time that Gore-Booth first became politically active and joined the National Union of Women's Suffrage Societies (NUWSS). Later she moved to Paris and enrolled at the prestigious Académie Julian where she met her future husband, Casimir Markievicz, an artist from a wealthy Polish family from present-day Ukraine.

The Markieviczes settled in Dublin in 1903 and moved in artistic and literary circles, with Constance gaining a reputation as a landscape painter. In 1905, along with artists Sarah Purser, Nathaniel Hone, Walter Osborne and John Butler Yeats, she was instrumental in founding the United Arts Club, which was an attempt to bring together all those in Dublin with an artistic and literary bent. This group included the leading figures of the Gaelic League founded by the future first President of Ireland, Douglas Hyde. Although formally concerned only with the preservation of the Irish language and culture, the league brought together many patriots and future political leaders. Sarah Purser, whom the young Gore-Booth sisters first met in 1882, when she was commissioned to paint their portrait, hosted a regular salon where artists, writers and intellectuals on both sides of the nationalist divide gathered. At Purser's house, Markievicz met revolutionary patriots Michael Davitt, John O'Leary and Maud Gonne. In 1907, Markievicz rented a cottage in the countryside near Dublin. The previous tenant, the poet Padraic Colum, had left behind copies of The Peasant and Sinn Féin. These revolutionary journals promoted independence from British rule. Markievicz read them and was propelled into action.

Politics 

In 1908, Markievicz became actively involved in nationalist politics in Ireland. She joined Sinn Féin and Inghinidhe na hÉireann ('Daughters of Ireland'), a revolutionary women's movement founded by the actress and activist Maud Gonne, muse of WB Yeats. Markievicz came directly to her first meeting from a function at Dublin Castle, the seat of British rule in Ireland, wearing a satin ball gown and a diamond tiara. Naturally, the members looked upon her with some hostility. This refreshing change from being "kowtowed"-to as a countess only made her more eager to join, she told her friend Helena Molony. She performed with Maud Gonne in several plays at the newly established Abbey Theatre, an institution that played an important part in the rise of cultural nationalism. In the same year, Markievicz played a dramatic role in the women's suffrage campaigners' tactic of opposing Winston Churchill's election to Parliament during the Manchester North West by-election, flamboyantly appearing in the constituency driving an old-fashioned carriage drawn by four white horses to promote the suffragist cause. A male heckler asked her if she could cook a dinner, to which she responded, "Yes. Can you drive a coach and four?" Her sister Eva had moved to Manchester to live with fellow suffragette Esther Roper and they both campaigned against the anti-suffragist Churchill with her. Churchill lost the election to Conservative candidate William Joynson-Hicks, in part as a result of the suffragists' dedicated opposition.

In 1909 Markievicz founded Fianna Éireann, a nationalist scouting organisation that instructed teenage boys in scouting, in the style of Robert Baden-Powell's then-paramilitary Boy Scouts. At the Fianna's first meeting in Camden Street, Dublin, on 16 August 1909, she was almost expelled on the basis that women did not belong in a physical force movement. She had drawn in Bulmer Hobson, who had earlier founded a less successful boy scout group in Belfast. He supported her, and she was elected to the committee. She was jailed for the first time in 1911 for speaking at an Irish Republican Brotherhood demonstration attended by 30,000 people, organised to protest against George V's visit to Ireland. During this protest, Markievicz handed out leaflets, erected great banners emblazoned Dear land thou art not conquered yet, participated in stone-throwing at pictures of the King and Queen and attempted to burn the giant British flag taken from Leinster House, eventually succeeding, but then seeing James McArdle imprisoned for one month for the incident, despite Markievicz testifying in court that she was responsible. Her friend Helena Molony was arrested for her part in the stone-throwing and became the first woman in Ireland to be tried and imprisoned for a political act since the time of the Ladies Land League.

Markievicz joined James Connolly's socialist Irish Citizen Army (ICA), a volunteer force formed in response to the lock-out of 1913 to defend the demonstrating workers from the police. Markievicz recruited volunteers to peel potatoes in the basement of Liberty Hall while she and others worked on distributing the food. As all the food was paid out of her own pocket, Markievicz was forced to take out loans and to sell her jewellery. That year, with Inghinidhe na hÉireann, she ran a soup kitchen to feed poor children and enable them to attend school.

In the Inghininidhe na h-Éireann magazine Bean na h-Éireann, Markievicz's advice to women was: "Dress suitably in short skirts and strong boots, leave your jewels in the bank and buy a revolver."

Easter Rising 

As a member of the Citizen Army, Markievicz took part in the 1916 Easter Rising. She was deeply inspired by the founder of the ICA, James Connolly. Markievicz designed the Citizen Army uniform and composed its anthem, based on the tune of a Polish song.

Markievicz fought in St Stephen's Green, where on the first morning —according to the only two pages surviving of the diary of an alleged witness — she shot a member of the Dublin Metropolitan Police, Constable Lahiff, who subsequently died of his injuries. Other accounts place her at City Hall when the policeman was shot, only arriving at Stephen's Green later. It was long thought that she was second in command to Michael Mallin, but in fact it was Christopher "Kit" Poole who held that position. Markievicz supervised the setting-up of barricades on Easter Monday and was in the middle of the fighting all around Stephen's Green, wounding a British army sniper. Trenches were dug in the Green, sheltered by the front gate; however, after British machine gun and rifle fire from the rooftops of tall buildings on the north side of the Green including the Shelbourne Hotel, the Citizen Army troops withdrew to the Royal College of Surgeons on the west side of the Green.

The Stephen's Green garrison held out for six days, ending the engagement when the British brought them Pearse's surrender order. The British officer, Captain (later Major) de Courcy Wheeler, who accepted their surrender was married to Markievicz's first cousin, Selina Maude Beresford Knox.

They were taken to Dublin Castle and then to Kilmainham Gaol through what Matt Connolly described as "several groups of hostile people". There, she was the only one of 70 women prisoners who was put into solitary confinement. At her court-martial on 4 May 1916, Markievicz pleaded not guilty to "taking part in an armed rebellion...for the purpose of assisting the enemy," but pleaded guilty to having attempted "to cause disaffection among the civil population of His Majesty". Markievicz told the court, "I went out to fight for Ireland's freedom and it does not matter what happens to me. I did what I thought was right and I stand by it." She was sentenced to death, but the court recommended mercy "solely and only on account of her sex". The sentence was commuted to life in prison. When told of this, she said to her captors, "I do wish your lot had the decency to shoot me".

Markievicz was transferred to Mountjoy Prison, Holloway Prison and then to Aylesbury Prison in England in July 1916. She was released from prison in 1917, along with others involved in the Rising, as the government in London granted a general amnesty for those who had participated in it. It was around this time that Markievicz, born into the Church of Ireland, converted to Catholicism.

First Dáil 

In 1918, she was jailed again for her part in anti-conscription activities. At the 1918 general election, Markievicz was elected for the constituency of Dublin St Patrick's, beating her opponent William Field with 66% of the vote, as one of 73 Sinn Féin MPs. The results were called on 28 December 1918. This made her the first woman elected to the United Kingdom House of Commons. However, in line with Sinn Féin abstentionist policy, she did not take her seat in the House of Commons.

Markievicz was in Holloway prison when her colleagues assembled in Dublin at the first meeting of the First Dáil, the Parliament of the revolutionary Irish Republic. When her name was called, she was described, like many of those elected, as being "imprisoned by the foreign enemy" (fé ghlas ag Gallaibh). She was re-elected to the Second Dáil in the elections of 1921.

Markievicz served as Minister for Labour from April 1919 to January 1922, in the Second Ministry and the Third Ministry of the Dáil. Holding cabinet rank from April to August 1919, she became both the first Irish female Cabinet Minister and at the same time, only the second female government minister in Europe. She was the only female cabinet minister in Irish history until 1979 when Máire Geoghegan-Quinn was appointed to the cabinet post of Minister for the Gaeltacht for Fianna Fáil.
Her Labour department was concerned with setting up Conciliation Boards, arbitrating labour disputes, surveying areas and establishing guidelines for wages and food prices.

Civil War and Fianna Fáil 
Markievicz left the government in January 1922 along with Éamon de Valera and others in opposition to the Anglo-Irish Treaty. She worked actively for the Republican cause in the Irish Civil War, including directing the Citizen Army in the occupation of Moran's Hotel in Dublin. After the civil war she toured the United States. She was not elected in the 1922 Irish general election but was returned in 1923 for the Dublin South constituency. In common with other Republican candidates, she did not take her Dáil seat. She was arrested again in November 1923. In prison, she went on hunger strike, and within a month, she and other prisoners were released.

She left Sinn Féin and joined the Fianna Fáil party on its foundation in 1926, chairing the inaugural meeting of the new party in La Scala Theatre. In the June 1927 general election, she was re-elected to the 5th Dáil as a candidate for Fianna Fáil, which was pledged to return to Dáil Éireann, but died only five weeks later, before she could take her seat. Her fellow Fianna Fáil TDs signed the controversial Oath of Allegiance and took their seats in the Dáil on 12 August 1927, less than a month after her death. The party leader Éamon de Valera described the Oath as "an empty political formula".

Family life 
Constance's husband, Casimir Markievicz, was known in Paris as Count Markievicz, a title that was the norm for large landowners in Poland at this time. When the Gore-Booth family enquired as to the validity of the title, they were informed through Pyotr Rachkovsky of the Russian Secret Police that he had taken the title "without right", and that there had never been a "Count Markievicz" in Poland. However, the Department of Genealogy in Saint Petersburg said that he was entitled to claim to be a member of the nobility. Markievicz was married, though separated, at the time they met; his wife died in 1899 and he and Gore-Booth married in London on 29 September 1900. She gave birth to their daughter, Maeve, at Lissadell in November 1901. The child was mainly raised by her Gore-Booth grandparents. Stanislas, Casimir's son from his first marriage, accompanied the couple to Ireland after their honeymoon visit to his homeland.

In 1913 Markievicz's husband moved back to Ukraine, and never returned to live in Ireland. However, they did correspond and he was by her side when she died.

Death 
Markievicz died at the age of 59 on 15 July 1927, of complications after two appendicitis operations, a dangerous surgery in the days before antibiotics. She had given away the last of her wealth, and died in a public ward "among the poor where she wanted to be". One of the doctors attending her was her revolutionary colleague Kathleen Lynn. Also at her bedside were Casimir and Stanislas Markievicz, Éamon de Valera and Hanna Sheehy Skeffington. Prior to her death, Esther Roper maintained a vigil at Constance's bed with Marie Perolz, Helena Molony, Kathleen Lynn and other friends. Refused a state funeral by the Free State government, she was laid out in the Rotunda, where she had spoken at so many political meetings. Thousands of the Dubliners who loved her lined O'Connell Street and Parnell Square to pass by her body and pay their respects to 'Madame'. It took four hours for the beginning of the funeral, starting from the Rotunda, to reach the gates of Glasnevin Cemetery. Eamon de Valera gave the funeral oration, while Free State soldiers stood on guard to prevent the rifle salute that Michael Collins had called “the only speech which it is proper to make above the grave of a dead Fenian”.

Her former Citizen Army colleague the playwright Seán O'Casey said of her: "One thing she had in abundance—physical courage; with that she was clothed as with a garment."

Tributes 
In 2018, a portrait of Markievicz was donated by the Irish parliament to the British House of Commons to commemorate the 1918 Representation of the People Act, under which, some women were allowed the right to vote for the first time in the United Kingdom.

In 2019, a Dublin City Council Commemorative Plaque was unveiled at Markievicz's former home in Dublin, Surrey House on Leinster Road in Rathmines.

Notes

References

Further reading

External links 

 Constance Markievicz Archive at marxists.org
 ‘Women, ideals and the nation’ speech available from the Digital Library@Villanova University
 Her speeches in the Treaty Debates
 Article on Constance Markievicz
 Life As A Rebel & Co-Founder of The Irish Citizen's Army 
 Countess Markievicz and Easter 1916
 

1868 births
1927 deaths
Académie Julian alumni
Anglican socialists
British suffragists
Burials at Glasnevin Cemetery
Catholic socialists
Converts to Roman Catholicism from Anglicanism
Cumann na mBan members
Daughters of baronets
Early Sinn Féin TDs
Female members of the Parliament of the United Kingdom for Irish constituencies
Fianna Fáil TDs
Constance
Irish Citizen Army members
Irish revolutionaries
Members of the 1st Dáil
Members of the 2nd Dáil
Members of the 4th Dáil
Members of the 5th Dáil
20th-century women Teachtaí Dála
Members of the Parliament of the United Kingdom for County Dublin constituencies (1801–1922)
People of the Easter Rising
People of the Irish Civil War (Anti-Treaty side)
19th-century Polish nobility
Politicians from County Sligo
Protestant Irish nationalists
Irish socialist feminists
UK MPs 1918–1922
Women government ministers of the Republic of Ireland
Women in war 1900–1945
Women in war in Ireland
Women of the Victorian era
Female revolutionaries
20th-century Polish nobility